Frances Cope, also known as Frances Thorndike (August 19, 1902 - May 14, 1982), was an American mathematician who published on irregular differential equations. The Thorndike nomogram, a two-dimensional diagram of the Poisson distribution, is named for her.

Education and career
Born Elizabeth Frances Thorndike in New York City and known as Frances, her parents were Elizabeth (Moulton) Thorndike and Edward L. Thorndike, an educational psychologist who taught at Teachers College, Columbia University.

Frances was educated at Horace Mann School in New York and at Drum Hill High School in Peekskill. She graduated from Vassar College in 1922 and earned her master's degree in mathematics from Columbia University in 1925. In a 1926 paper, she first published a two-dimensional diagram of the Poisson distribution that is now named the Thorndike nomogram after her.

She worked for several years as an engineering assistant at American Telephone and Telegraph Company (1922–24, 1925–27) before becoming an instructor of physics at Vassar (1927–28). She spent the 1928–29 academic year as a fellow working towards a Ph.D. at Radcliffe College, where she met fellow mathematician Thomas Freeman Cope; they married in 1929.

In 1930, Cope and her husband moved to Ohio (where he had a job at Marietta College), and two years later she completed her doctorate at Radcliffe as a student of George David Birkhoff. The subject of her Ph.D. thesis was formal solutions of irregular differential equations, and the publications that came out of it continue to be cited in the literature of both mathematics and physics.

Cope taught mathematics as an instructor at Vassar in 1935–36. In 1937 the Copes moved to New York, where she was an instructor of math at Queens College in 1941 and Adelphi College from 1941 to 1943.

She died in Montrose, New York.

Personal life
Frances and Thomas had three children, a son and two daughters.  Thomas survived Frances by two years.

References

External links 
Thorndike nomogram, in Gizapedia.

20th-century American mathematicians
20th-century women mathematicians
American women mathematicians
Vassar College alumni
Radcliffe College alumni
Mathematicians from New York (state)
1902 births
1982 deaths
20th-century American women